Anthony Bullick (born 30 July 1985) is a New Zealand former cricketer. He played eight first-class matches for Otago between 2007 and 2011. He was born at Hamilton and educated at Kings' College.

References

External links
 

1985 births
Living people
New Zealand cricketers
Otago cricketers
Cricketers from Hamilton, New Zealand